The flag of the Komi Autonomous Soviet Socialist Republic was adopted in 1954 by the government of the Komi Autonomous Soviet Socialist Republic. The flag is identical to the flag of the Russian Soviet Federative Socialist Republic.

History

First version 
The first flag of the Komi ASSR was described in the first Constitution of the Komi ASSR, which was adopted by the Central Executive Committee of the Komi ASSR on 26 May 1937, at the 11th Extraordinary Congress of Soviets of the Komi ASSR. The flag is described in Article 116 of the constitution :

Second version 
On 1938, the writing system of the Komi language was changed. The Komi inscriptions on the flag, which previously used Latin Molodtsov alphabet, was changed into Cyrillic letters.

Third version 
After the changes to the flag of the Russian SFSR in 1954, the flag of the Komi ASSR was accordingly changed. This was confirmed by the amendment to the Constitution of the Komi ASSR on 23 July 1954 by the Supreme Soviet of the Komi ASSR. The flag is now described in the Article 112 of the constitution :

On March 16, 1956, the Decree of the Presidium of the Supreme Council of the Komi ASSR approved the Regulations of the Flag of the Komi ASSR.

On May 23, 1978, the Extraordinary 8th Session of the Supreme Council of the Komi ASSR on the 9th convocation approved the new Constitution of the Komi ASSR. The flag of the Komi ASSR was described in Article 158. The design of the flag remained unchanged.

A new version of the Regulations of the Flag of the Komi ASSR was approved by the PVS with the decree on September 15, 1981, and the supplement to the Regulations was approved on September 18, 1984.

Gallery

References

Citations

Bibliography 

Komi Autonomous Soviet Socialist Republic
1954 establishments in the Soviet Union